Lal Paltan ('Red Army') was a Bengali language weekly published in Bengal, India. The first edition appeared in October 1928. The editor of the paper was Bimal Ganguly, publicity officer of the Lilloah E.I.R. Union. The paper carried the hammer and sickle on its first page. British colonial authorities deemed the publication as communist.

References

Bengali-language newspapers published in India
Communist newspapers
Publications established in 1928
Defunct newspapers published in India
Communist periodicals published in India
1928 establishments in India